Following are terms that specify a type of lung size and/or activity. More specific definitions may be found in individual articles.
Eupnea – normal breathing
Apnea – absence of breathing
Bradypnea – decreased breathing rate
Dyspnea or shortness of breath – sensation of respiratory distress
Hyperaeration/Hyperinflation – increased lung volume
Hyperpnea – fast and deep breathing
Hyperventilation – increased breathing that causes CO2 loss
Hypopnea – slow and shallow breathing
Hypoventilation – decreased breathing that causes CO2 gain
Labored breathing – physical presentation of respiratory distress
Tachypnea – increased breathing rate
Orthopnea – Breathlessness in lying down position relieved by sitting up or standing
Platypnea – Breathlessness when seated or standing, relieved by lying flat
Trepopnea – Breathlessness when lying flat relieved by lying in a lateral position
Ponopnea – Painful breathing

See also
Control of respiration

Lung